Charles R. Ross is an American funeral director and politician from Washington. Ross is a Republican Party member of the Washington House of Representatives, representing the 14th district.

Career 
In 1990, Ross served in the United States Navy, until 1994. Ross served on the USS Kitty Hawk during the Persian Gulf War.

In 1996, Ross became a funeral director.

In 2006, Ross won the election and became a Republican Party member of the Washington House of Representatives for District 14.

Awards 
 2014 Guardians of Small Business award. Presented by NFIB.

Personal life 
Ross' wife is CarriAnn Ross. They have two children. Ross and his family life in Naches, Washington.

References

External links 
 Charles Ross at ballotpedia.org

Year of birth missing (living people)
Living people
American funeral directors
Republican Party members of the Washington House of Representatives